The Scottish Government Justice and Communities Directorates were a group of Directorates within the Scottish Government 2007–2010.

History
In 2007, the first Salmond government undertook a large reorganisation of the civil service to match a new ministerial structure.  The Scottish Executive Justice Department (SEJD) became part of the directorate. The Cabinet Secretary for Justice was Kenny MacAskill, and he has responsibility for criminal justice, police, fire and rescue, courts and civil law in Scotland.  MacAskill was supported by the Minister for Community Safety, Fergus Ewing.

In December 2010 there was a further reorganisation and these functions were transferred to the Governance and Communities Directorates and the Learning and Justice Directorates.

Ministers 
Cabinet Secretary for Justice — Kenny MacAskill
Minister for Community Safety — Fergus Ewing

Structure
It was responsible for the following Executive agencies:
 Accountant in Bankruptcy;
 Scottish Court Service;
 Scottish Prison Service.

See also
Scots law
Home Office
Ministry of Justice

References 

Justice
Justice ministries
Organisations based in Edinburgh
Scotland